The Boston Red Sox are a professional baseball team based in Boston, Massachusetts. The Red Sox are members of the American League (AL) East Division in Major League Baseball (MLB).  They have competed since 1901, initially as the Boston Americans (1901–1907), and under their current name since 1908. Since 1912, the Red Sox have played their home games at Fenway Park. In baseball, the head coach of a team is called the manager, or more formally, the field manager. There have been 48 different managers in franchise history; the current manager is Alex Cora, who previously managed the team during the 2018 and 2019 seasons and was re-hired by the team on November 6, 2020.

Jimmy Collins was the first manager of the franchise, managing from 1901 to 1906. Among all Red Sox managers, Joe Cronin managed the most regular season games (2,007) and registered the most regular season wins (1,071), while Terry Francona managed the most playoff games (45) and registered the most playoff wins (28). The most World Series championships won by a Red Sox manager is two, accomplished by Bill Carrigan (1915 and 1916) and Francona (2004 and 2007). John McNamara and Jimy Williams are the only two Red Sox managers to win the AL Manager of the Year Award, in 1986 and 1999, respectively.

Key

Managers 
The below table summarizes the franchise's managerial records since 1901, its inaugural season in the American League. Note that the number of games managed (GM) may exceed the sum of wins and losses, due to tie games that were later replayed; for example, Jimmy Collins had a regular season managerial record of 455–376, which sums to 831, 11 less than the 842 total regular season games that he managed.

Statistics updated through the  season.

 One game of the 1912 World Series ended in a tie, and was replayed.

Notes

Sources

References

Red Sox
Managers